XEJPV-AM is a radio station in Ciudad Juárez, Chihuahua, Mexico. Broadcasting on 1560 AM, XEJPV is owned by MegaRadio and is known as W Radio.

History

The concession history for XEJPV begins with a concession awarded in 1968 for the station to José de Jesús Partida Villanueva, who would later own two television stations: XHAUC-TV in Chihuahua City, Chihuahua and XHTX-TV in Tuxtla Gutiérrez, Chiapas.

From 1997 to 2017, XEJPV was known as Radio Viva with a religious format. This ended to make way for a sports format known as Radio Deportiva. On August 31, 2020, it changed to the W Radio talk format with programming from W Radio.

References

Daytime-only radio stations in Mexico
1968 establishments in Mexico
Mass media in Ciudad Juárez
Mexican radio stations with expired concessions
News and talk radio stations in Mexico
Radio stations in Chihuahua
Radio stations established in 1968
Spanish-language radio stations